In Greek mythology, Eudoros (Ancient Greek: Εὔδωρος) was the second of Achilles' five commanders at the Trojan War.

Family 
Eudoros was a demigod, the son of Hermes and Polymele, who danced in Artemis' choir. Polymele's father Phylas brought him up after she married Echekles.He was Hermes son.

Mythology 
According to the Iliad, Eudoros commanded ten penteconters and five hundred Myrmidons. In Book XVI of the Iliad, when Patroclus readies Achilles' men, Homer talks about him for fourteen lines – more than any of the other commanders in this passage. He is also the second most notable of the five, beaten only by Phoenix. Eudoros was very fast, and a good fighter.

In popular culture
Eudoros appears in the 2004 film Troy, played by Vincent Regan. He is the second-in-command of Achilles' fifty Myrmidons (rather fewer than the 2,500 Myrmidons in the Iliad). He is Achilles' oldest friend, and partly takes the role of Phoenix as simultaneously Achilles' respectful mentor and follower. When the Greeks first arrive at Troy, Achilles and Eudorus storm the beach together, along with the other Myrmidons. He captures Briseis and delivers her to Achilles. He is present when Patroclus is killed by Hector, and brings the news to Achilles. In his shock and anger, Achilles strikes Eudorus to the ground; he later apologizes and asks Eudorus to leave him at Troy and take the Myrmidons home.

Notes

References 

 Homer, The Iliad with an English Translation by A.T. Murray, Ph.D. in two volumes. Cambridge, MA., Harvard University Press; London, William Heinemann, Ltd. 1924. . Online version at the Perseus Digital Library.
 Homer, Homeri Opera in five volumes. Oxford, Oxford University Press. 1920. . Greek text available at the Perseus Digital Library.

Achaeans (Homer)
Children of Hermes
Demigods in classical mythology